The 1967 BYU Cougars football team was an American football team that represented Brigham Young University (BYU) as a member of the Western Athletic Conference (WAC) during the 1967 NCAA University Division football season. In their fourth season under head coach Tommy Hudspeth, the Cougars compiled an overall record of 6–4 with a mark of 3–2 against conference opponents, finished third in the WAC, and outscored opponents by a total of 278 to 215.

Schedule

References

BYU
BYU Cougars football seasons
BYU Cougars football